Pul (also Romanized as Pūl) is a city in Zanus Rastaq Rural District, Kojur District, Nowshahr County, Mazandaran Province, Iran. At the 2006 census, its population was 1,204, in 330 families.

References 

Populated places in Nowshahr County
Cities in Mazandaran Province